Sheikha Amna bint Abdulaziz bin Jassim Al Thani (Arabic: الشيخة آمنة بنت عبد العزيز بن جاسم آل ثاني) is a Qatari businesswoman who is Director of the National Museum of Qatar.

Education 
Sheikha Amna graduated with a BSc in Business Administration and English from Carnegie Mellon University. She also earned an MSc in sociology from the London School of Economics.

Career 
Prior to her work at the National Museum of Qatar, Sheikha Amna worked in the Investment Banking division of Goldman Sachs at Qatar Financial Centre. She was also Director of Finance and Strategy for the office of H.E. Sheikha Al Mayassa bint Hamad bin Khalifa Al Thani, who is Chair of Qatar Museums.

In 2013 she was appointed as Director of the, then under-construction, National Museum of Qatar. She has previously co-ordinated the Steering Committee for the future museum. The National Museum of Qatar opened in 2019, with Sheikha Amna as its Director. The museum was developed in collaboration with Qatari people over the preceding decade prior to its opening. Through consultation, themes were developed which were used in the final layout of the museum. However Sheikha Amna said it "is not a showcase for a collection. It is a journey—and like any true journey, it does not merely take people from one place to another." She has also described how "the story of the people of Qatar" is at the centre of the museum's interpretation. The new museum also asked Qatari people for contemporary contributions to add to the museum's collection. In 2020 she collaborated with collectors and historians to showcase Qatar's automobile history in an exhibition at the museum.

In addition to her directorship she is a member of the Middle East Board of the World Class Learning Group (WCL Group) and on the Industrial Advisory Committee to the Centre of the Advanced Materials (CAM) at Qatar University. In 2018 she joined the board of the Journal of Interpretation Research.

References 

Year of birth missing (living people)
Qatari women
Museum directors
Women museum directors
Curators
Women curators
House of Thani
Alumni of the London School of Economics
Living people